Clayton Edward Pachal (April 21, 1956 – February 7, 2021) was a Canadian professional ice hockey centre. He played 36 games in the National Hockey League between 1977 and 1978 with the Boston Bruins and Colorado Rockies.

Biography
Born in Yorkton, Saskatchewan, Pachal was drafted in the first round, 16th overall, by the Boston Bruins in the 1976 NHL Amateur Draft.  He was also drafted in the second round, 17th overall, by the Winnipeg Jets in the 1976 World Hockey Association draft; however, he never played in that league. He played 35 games in the National Hockey League: 11 with the Bruins and 24 with the Colorado Rockies. He died in 2021 at the age of 64.

Career statistics

Regular season and playoffs

International

References

External links
 

1956 births
2021 deaths
Binghamton Dusters players
Boston Bruins draft picks
Boston Bruins players
Broome Dusters players
Canadian ice hockey centres
Cincinnati Stingers (CHL) players
Colorado Rockies (NHL) players
Grand Rapids Owls players
Ice hockey people from Saskatchewan
National Hockey League first-round draft picks
New Westminster Bruins players
Sportspeople from Yorkton
Philadelphia Firebirds (AHL) players
Rochester Americans players
Winnipeg Jets (WHA) draft picks
Yorkton Terriers players